NSCD may refer to:

 National Sports Center for the Disabled, an American non-profit organisation based in Colorado
 Northern School of Contemporary Dance, a dance school in Leeds, England
 nscd - a  name-server caching daemon in computer networking